Catullus 5 is a passionate ode to Lesbia and one of the most famous poems by Catullus. The poem encourages lovers to scorn the snide comments of others, and to live only for each other, since life is brief and death brings a night of perpetual sleep. This poem has been translated and imitated many times.

This poem is written in the Phalaecian hendecasyllabic meter (Latin: hendecasyllabus phalaecius) which has verses of 11 syllables, a common form in Catullus' poetry.

Text 

1 Vivāmus, mea Lesbia, atque amemus,
2 rumoresque senum severiorum
3 omnes unius aestimemus assis!
4 soles occidere et redire possunt;
5 nobis, cum semel occidit brevis lux,
6 nox est perpetua una dormienda.
7 da mi basia mille, deinde centum,
8 dein mille altera, dein secunda centum,
9 deinde usque altera mille, deinde centum;
10 dein, cum milia multa fecerimus,
11 conturbabimus illa, ne sciamus,
12 aut ne quis malus invidere possit,
13 cum tantum sciat esse basiorum.
Let us live, my Lesbia, and love,
and the rumors of rather stern old men
let us value all at just one penny!
Suns may set and rise again;
for us, when once the brief light has set,
an eternal night must be slept.
Give me a thousand kisses, then a hundred,
then another thousand, then a second hundred,
then yet another thousand, then a hundred;
then, when we have performed many thousands,
we shall shake them into confusion, in order that we might not know,
and in order not to let any evil person envy us,
when he knows that there are so many of our kisses.

Poetic effects 

Line 5–6

The position of lux (light) and nox (night) right next to each other serve to emphasise his two comparisons. Symbolically, the "perpetual night" represents death and the "brief light" represents life.
Furthermore, there is also a second chiasmus in these lines:

Translations 
In 1601, the English composer, poet and physician Thomas Campion wrote this rhyming free translation of the first half (to which he added two verses of his own, and music, to create a lute song):

My sweetest Lesbia, let us live and love;
And though the sager sort our deeds reprove,
Let us not weigh them. Heaven's great lamps do dive
Into their west, and straight again revive,
But soon as once is set our little light,
Then must we sleep one ever-during night.

Ben Jonson drew on the poem in poems 5, "Song. To Celia," and 6, "Song. To the Same" in his collection The Forrest.

Soon thereafter, Sir Walter Raleigh included the following verse, apparently based on Campion's translation, in his The Historie of the World, which he wrote while imprisoned in the Tower of London

The Sunne may set and rise
But we contrariwise
Sleepe after our short light
One everlasting night.

References

Bibliography 

 
 
 
 
 
 

C005
Love poems
Articles containing video clips